Zard Dul (also Romanized as Zard Dūl) is a village in Shanderman Rural District, Shanderman District, Masal County, Gilan Province, Iran. At the 2006 census, its population was 55, in 15 families.

References 

Populated places in Masal County